The 2008–09 Ole Miss Rebels men's basketball team represented the University of Mississippi in the 2008–09 college basketball season. This was head coach Andy Kennedy's third season at Ole Miss. The Rebels competed in the Southeastern Conference and played their home games at Tad Smith Coliseum. They finished the season with a record of 16–15, 7–9 in SEC play and did not qualify for any postseason tournaments.

Roster
Source

Rankings

Schedule and results
Source

|-
!colspan=9 style=|Regular Season
|-

|-
!colspan=10 style=| SEC tournament

References

Ole Miss
Ole Miss Rebels men's basketball seasons
Ole Miss Rebels
Ole Miss Rebels